The Venerable Wilfred Ernest Granville Payton CB, MA (27 December 1913 – 4 September 1989) was an English clergyman and cricketer who played first-class cricket for Nottinghamshire in 1935, Cambridge University in 1937 and Derbyshire in 1949.

Payton was born at Beeston, Nottinghamshire, the son of Wilfred Payton who also played for Nottinghamshire. He was educated at Nottingham High School and Emmanuel College, Cambridge. He made his debut for Nottinghamshire against Cambridge University in May 1935 when he made double figure scores. In 1937 he played for Cambridge following a top score of 74 in the Seniors' match. He opened with Paul Gibb, but he won his Blue as much for his keenness in the field as for his dogged batting. His contributions at the varsity match were 10 and 3.

On 1 January 1941 Payton was commissioned into the Royal Air Force as a chaplain. After World War II service with the Royal Air Force Volunteer Reserve, Payton played thirteen first-class games for the Combined Services, and in 1948 he was bowled when 2 runs short of a century in a convincing win over Glamorgan in their Championship year. Payton played two matches for Derbyshire in the 1949 season.

Payton was a right-hand batsman who played 52 innings in 27 first-class matches with an average of 20.72 and a top score of 98.

Payton was Chaplain-in-Chief to the RAF and became honorary chaplain to The Queen in 1965. He retired from the RAF in 1969 and became Vicar and Rural Dean of Abingdon.

Payton died at Ladder Hill, Nailsworth, Gloucestershire at the age of 75.

References

1913 births
1989 deaths
People educated at Nottingham High School
Alumni of Emmanuel College, Cambridge
English cricketers
Nottinghamshire cricketers
Cambridge University cricketers
Combined Services cricketers
Derbyshire cricketers
20th-century English Anglican priests
World War II chaplains
Honorary Chaplains to the Queen
Companions of the Order of the Bath
Royal Air Force Chaplains-in-Chief
English military chaplains
Royal Air Force Volunteer Reserve personnel of World War II